Schizothorax plagiostomus is a species of ray-finned fish in the genus Schizothorax.
Schizothorax plagiostomus locally known as khont, snow trout, snow carp, snow barble and Swati fish has an elongated sub cylindrical body with short, blunt and slightly prognathous upper jaw. Ventral surface of head and anterior part of body flattish, short, somewhat cone shaped and blunt. Snout usually smooth covered with warys in male. Interorbital space broad and flat. Mouth inferior, wide and slightly arched; lips fleshy and continuous, marginally sharply attenuated, lower lip papillae and reflected from jaw, margin of lower lip sharp, covered with firm and hard horny cartilage; a strip of papillae labial plate at chin present. Barbless two pairs. Pharyngeal teeth in three rows. Dorsal fin inserted about opposite to pelvic fins, its last undivided ray osseous, strong and serrated posterior, short than head. Caudal fin deeply emarginated. Scales very small and elliptical; lipids irregular.

Geographically S. plagiostomus spread in different rivers, and tributaries throughout Himalaya extending to confines of China, Afghanistan, Pakistan, Turkistan, Nepal, Ladkah, Tibet, Bhutan and north-eastern India (Day, 1958). In India, S. plagiostomus is the most important food fish of the Himalayan region, including Kashmir, Himachal Pradesh, Uttarakhand, the Uttar Pradesh foothills and Assam (Day, 1958). It also plays an important role in commercial fish production (Bahuguna, 2002).
From the subfamily Schizothorancinae 12 species are reported from Pakistan . The schizothoracine fishes provide a good material to study patterns of evolutionary modifications in terms of their biogeographic distribution. These species are expert in fast running high-elevation streams and rivers and show remarkable fitness for their environment. 
The Genus Schizothorax (Heckel, 1838) is one of the most diversified and abundant group with 68 species around Central Asia, Himalayas, Pakistan, India and Tibetan Plateau. Snow trout, Schizothorax plagiostomus(Heckel, 1838) is the most important food fish of different rivers, lakes and tributaries throughout Himalayas extending to parts of China, Afghanistan, Nepal, Bhutan, North East India, Kashmir and northern areas of Pakistan including River Panjkora Dir Upper. Upper parts of River Panjkora especially Kumrat Valley (From Thal to Chukyatan) Schizothorax were one found very abundantly, but due to a massive viral outbreak in June, 2016, its populations reduced drastically.

According to Raizada (1985) S. plagiostomus weighs up to 2.5 kg and reaches 60 cm in length. It is sexually mature at 18–24 cm length and spawns in natural and artificial environments in two seasons, September–October and March–April. It spawns naturally in clear water on a gravelly or fine pebbled bed at 10–30 cm depth. Water current of 2.8–4 m/s, pH 7.5, dissolved oxygen concentrations Of 10–15 mg/L and gravel size of 50–60 mm are the optimum conditions for spawning.
In the almost similar appearance of schizothorancine fishes, S. plagiostomus can be separated by its short, deep cornified lower jaw, with a transverse or sometimes only slightly curved sharp cutting margin. The lower and upper lips are connected by a smooth rounded corner. The particular arrangement of lower jaw structure was referred to as “sector mouth”

References 

Schizothorax